Malkan Amin (August 11, 1948 – December 9, 2020) was an Indonesian politician who represented both the Golkar and NasDem parties.

Biography
Amin was born on August 11, 1948 in Barru, South Sulawesi, Indonesia. He did his primary and secondary schooling in Makassar. Starting in 1987 he became director of a construction business in Ujung Pandang, and from 1992 onwards various businesses located in Jakarta.

In 1997 he was elected as a Member of the People's Consultative Assembly (MPR), which he held for a 2-year term. He was a Member of the People's Representative Council from 1999 to 2013, representing the Golkar party for South Sulawesi. For a time he was Deputy Secretary General of the party. In 2013 he decided to resign from Golkar to join the Nasdem Party (National Democrats). For a time he was chairman of NasDem's regional organization in West Sumatra.

Amin died from COVID-19 on December 9, 2020 at Wahidin Sudirohusodo Hospital in Makassar, South Sulawesi. He was 72 years old. At the time he was running for office to become Bupati of Barru for Nasdem.

References

1948 births
2020 deaths
People from Barru Regency
Golkar politicians
Nasdem Party politicians
Members of the People's Representative Council, 1999
Members of the People's Representative Council, 2004
Members of the People's Representative Council, 2009
Deaths from the COVID-19 pandemic in Indonesia
Indonesian Muslims